The 1980 NCAA Division II football rankings are from the Associated Press. This is for the 1980 season.

Legend

Associated Press poll

References

Rankings
NCAA Division II football rankings